Broughton is a village and civil parish in the Ryedale district of North Yorkshire, England. According to the 2011 census the parish had a population of 212, a reduction from the 2001 census when it stood at 233.

References

Villages in North Yorkshire
Civil parishes in North Yorkshire